Welcome Home is the seventh album by Kane & Abel. It was released on July 22, 2003 for Most Wanted Empire and featured production from Kane & Abel, Howard "Chaotic" Metoyer and Sinista. The album was released after the brothers were released from prison and reached No. 75 on the Billboard Top R&B/Hip-Hop Albums chart. The single, "All Good", featuring Big Ramp, peaked at No. 31 on the Rap Singles chart.

Track listing
"Money and Power"- 0:41
"Welcome Home"- 3:35  (feat. Big Ramp)
"Do It"- 4:01  (feat. Box)
"Toot It Up"- 3:13  (feat. 5th Ward Weebie & Hotboy Ronald)
"Still Got Love"- 4:17
"All Good"- 4:49  (feat. Big Ramp)
"Ciagra"- 0:58
"Walk Like a Model"- 4:06
"Be Right There"- 3:25  (feat. Jan of US3)
"Whatcha Hollarin'"- 3:47
"Armed Robbery"- 2:56  (feat. Box)
"Real"- 3:35  (feat. Big Ramp)
"Smokin' Joe"- 1:20
"Ride Chrome"- 3:59  (feat. Box, Slim Reaper, Young Biz & Delvin)
"She Wanna"- 3:41  (feat. Big Ramp)
"Get Money"- 3:55  (feat. Box)
"Public Service Announcement"- 0:57

2003 albums
Kane & Abel (group) albums